is a Japanese manga series written and illustrated by Tite Kubo. The Bleach discography primarily consists of the original soundtrack produced for the Bleach, an anime adaptation of the manga. The soundtrack was composed by Shirō Sagisu and released in eight volumes and an anniversary box set. Numerous soundtracks have been released in different collections and sets. A series of character song albums, best-of albums composed of the theme songs, rock musical albums and drama CDs have also been released, all by Sony Music Entertainment Japan.

The Bleach anime opening and ending credits songs take from a diverse group of bands including Orange Range, UVERworld, High and Mighty Color, Beat Crusaders, YUI, Aqua Timez, Asian Kung-Fu Generation, Kelun, SCANDAL, Porno Graffitti, miwa, SID, ViViD, Rie Fu, Home Made Kazoku, Younha, SunSet Swish, Ikimono-gakari, JUNE, Mai Hoshimura, Oreskaband, chatmonchy, RSP, Lil'B, pe'zmoku, Stereopony, Tsuji Shion, Sambomaster, Spyair, Aimer and many more. Aqua Timez in particular was used for numerous theme songs throughout the course of the production.

The two albums from Bleach discography won the Japan Gold Disc Awards in category "Animation Album of the Year".

Compilation albums

Bleach The Best

Bleach Concept Album

Bleach Character Song

Beat Collection

Breathless Collection

Singles

TV Animation

Opening themes

Ending themes

Movie

Soundtracks

TV Animation

Movie

Rock musical
Aniplex has released three albums featuring songs from the musical Rock Musical Bleach.

Drama CD
Bleach drama CDs have been produced featuring the original voice actors. Drama CDs have only been included as part of the DVD (Limited Edition) releases.

References

External links
 Official Sony Music Bleach website 
 Official Aniplex Bleach website 

Book soundtracks
Discographies of Japanese artists
Anime soundtracks
 
Lists of soundtracks